Samuel Stearns Edick (June 17, 1834 in Columbia, Herkimer County, New York – January 3, 1900) was an American lawyer and politician from New York.

Life
He was the son of George L. Edick (c.1797–1836) and Abigail Webster (Hatch) Edick (c.1804–1840). He attended the district schools and Oxford Academy. Then he studied law, was admitted to the bar, and practiced in Cooperstown. On February 6, 1866, he married Evileen H. Tunnicliff (1842–1904), and they had several children.

He was District Attorney of Otsego County from 1867 to 1871; Judge of the Otsego County Court from 1872 to 1877; and a member of the New York State Senate (20th D.) in 1878 and 1879.

He was buried at the Lakewood Cemetery in Cooperstown.

Sources
 Civil List and Constitutional History of the Colony and State of New York compiled by Edgar Albert Werner (1884; pg. 291)
 The State Government for 1879 by Charles G. Shanks (Weed, Parsons & Co, Albany NY, 1879; pg. 61f)
 Edick genealogy at Get Man Data
 Edick genealogy at Schwald
 Tunnicliff-Edick at Family Tree Maker

1834 births
1900 deaths
Republican Party New York (state) state senators
People from Herkimer County, New York
People from Cooperstown, New York
County district attorneys in New York (state)
New York (state) state court judges
19th-century American politicians
19th-century American judges